Roger Poincelet (3 March 1921 - 1 November 1977) was a French jockey who rode a total of over 3,000 winners in a long career on both the flat and, initially, jumps. He is regarded as one of the finest French jockeys ever.

His first win came on Prince Aly Khan's Manchuria on 17 May 1937. In his home country, he won three Prix de l'Arc de Triomphes - on Coronation in 1949, Nuccio in 1952 and, lastly, on Prince Royal in 1964. He also went on to win five British classics - the 2,000 Guineas on Thunderhead in 1952, the 1,000 Guineas and Oaks on Never Too Late in 1960, the 1,000 Guineas again on Hula Dancer in 1963 and, most notably, the Derby on the rank outsider, Psidium in 1961.

Psidium had been the less-favoured of two horses from the same stable. Poincelet kept Psidium at the back of the field until reaching Tattenham Corner. He then brought the horse on a path along the outside of the field to win the race. In doing so, Psidium became the longest priced Derby winner for 48 years. Sovrango, the stable's number one horse, finished fourth. 

After he retired from race riding, Poincelet began training horses in 1971.

He died in a Paris hospital on Tuesday, 1 November 1977, aged 57, after a long and painful illness.

Major wins 
 Great Britain
1,000 Guineas Stakes - (2) - Never Too Late (1960), Hula Dancer (1963)
2,000 Guineas Stakes - Thunderhead (1952)
Ascot Gold Cup - Pan (1951)
Champion Stakes - Hafiz (1955)
Epsom Derby - Psidium (1961)
Epsom Oaks - Never Too Late (1960)
King George VI and Queen Elizabeth Stakes - (2) - Vimy (1955), Right Royal (1961)

 France
Prix de l'Arc de Triomphe - (3) - Coronation (1949), Nuccio (1952), Prince Royal (1964)
Prix du Jockey Club - Right Royal (1961)

External links
Pathe footage of Thunderhead winning the 2,000 Guineas in 1952
Pathe footage of Vimy winning the King George VI and Queen Elizabeth Stakes in 1955

References

1921 births
1977 deaths
French jockeys
Sportspeople from Paris